Paul Smith (born 13 March 1979) is an English singer and songwriter. He is best known as the leader singer of indie rock band Maxïmo Park.

Biography

Born in Billingham, Stockton-on-Tees, Smith is the eldest of three children, and was educated at Northfield School. He attended Newcastle University completing a BA and MA, studying Art History and English Linguistics, following a 1-year Foundation Studies course at Cleveland College of Art and Design in Hartlepool. He briefly worked as an art teacher at Stockton Riverside College before he was asked to join Maxïmo Park.

In 2014 Smith teamed up with Field Music singer Peter Brewis to record an album, Frozen by Sight, derived from his travel writing and featuring string arrangements by Brewis.

In 2015 he released Contradictions, a solo album, as Paul Smith and The Intimations, and in 2018, released fourth solo album Diagrams.

Personal life 
Smith has a daughter.

He is a fan of Middlesbrough F.C..

Solo discography
 Margins (2010)
 Frozen By Sight (with Peter Brewis) (2014)
 Contradictions (as Paul Smith and The Intimations) (2015)
 Diagrams (2018)

References

External links

 Official website

1979 births
Living people
English male singers
People from Billingham
English rock singers
Alumni of Newcastle University
People educated at Northfield School
21st-century English singers
21st-century British male singers